Baydardi is a Pakistani drama television series aired on ARY Digital from 26 March 2018. It features Aiman Khan and Affan Waheed and is produced by Abdullah Seja of Idream Entertainment.

Summary
Series deals with the issue of HIV AIDS, mostly thought as taboo in Pakistani society. Aiman Khan plays the lead role of Biya, a victim of HIV AIDS which is transferred to her through Shafay (her husband) and difficulties which she faced after her marriage as nobody blames Shafay but Biya and questioning about her character due to HIV.

Plot

Bia and Rabia are two sisters living with their brother Nasir and his wife, Rabia goes to university and Bia goes to a college. Rabia is in love with a boy named Rohail. Rohail is a flirt and dishonest person, unknown to Rabia. Rohail does drugs, other bad things, and has HIV/AIDS. His roommate and friend Shafay tells Rohail to stop this bad habits and to think about his poor parents and to stop this drug stuff and all, he does not know about HIV / AIDS on Rohail. One day, Bia and Shafay were travelling on the same bus as Rohail having used Shafay's car. Shafay forgot his money, so Bia, a stranger, pays rent for him. The next day, Shafay does the same, but declines the money saying he doesn't need charity. Soon, Shafay falls in love with her. Meanwhile, Rohail and Shafay due to staying in the same room, exchanges their clothes, foods and even razor which lead Shafay to being involved in the same disease (HIV). Later Shafay gets fed up of Rohail and leaves the flat in which they both were staying and goes back to his house. Only his mom and his only lovable maternal uncle stays there. Soon Shafay's health starts to deteriorate and his mother insists his checkup, only to find out of her son having Aids and concealing it from him. Rohail being upset, betraying Rabia and upsetting Shafay spends his days in the flat depressed and only contacts Shafay on the phone, as we see his health deteriorating too. Rabia also commits suicide because of Rohais betrayal as she was now unable to face her family, leaving Bia deeply grieved and blaming Rohail and Shafay for her sister's death. Shafay's mother decides on making her son's last days by keeping him happy and tracks down Bia and asking for her hand by her brother, however at first she denied Shafay's idea of marrying her due to her lower class. However Shafay's uncle is angry on the mothers decision but still both keep the Aids a secret. After Bia expects her first child, HIV+ status is revealed. She realizes this but is threatened to keep her mouth shut. Her behavior towards Shafay gets colder, but Shafay has no idea why is it so. Rohail soon turns to a hospital for his treatment, and learns about his disease. His health deteriorates day by day. Soon Shafay's finds out Bia's reports about her having Aids and blames her for being a characterless woman. His mother pretends to be unaware and Bia leaves the house hurt. She is about to hit a train when an old man saves her, who turns out to be Rohail's father, that Bia doesn't know. Bia spends her days at their house becoming their daughter, as non of them knew that she was their sons friends wife. On the other hand, Shafay's uncle screams out that Bia had AIDS because of Shafay, and depressed Shafay gets on with finding Bia. Rohails dies in the hospital claiming that Shafay is a pure charactered person who never did anything wrong. He also learns that due to him using his razor, Shafay had AIDS. Before dying, he writes his last will for Shafay to go to his parents and tell them about his death. Shafay does the same and goes to their house. Upon hearing Shafay's voice in the sitting room, Bia sneaks out of the house and runs to her brothers home. She meets Shafay's mother over there, who was there to take Bia home. Upon blurting out everything, Bia's brother asks Shafay's mother to leave and carries on with his sister's treatment. Shafay finally is able to convince Bia to come home and they both reconcile, spending their last days together happily and building hope for each other. Rohails parents grieve deeply on their sons death and cry bitterly on his grave. Finally, Shafay and Bia are hospitalized together, while Shafay takes a promise from Bia, for making him the first person to see the baby's face when it is born. Bia dies after childbirth and the doctor fulfills the wish. The baby is a girl who is taken to Shafay, who kisses and sees he baby's face. Shafay's uncle gives the prayer call in both the baby's ears and as soon as the prayer call finishes, Shafay dies. In the end we see Shafay's mother running an awareness about Aids / HIV on the television. Shafay's and Bia's daughter has grown up into a six-year-old. Rohail's parents have started teaching the Qu'ran to little children at their house. And the last scene closes with Shafay's mother uncle and daughter visiting the couple's grave.

Cast
Aiman Khan as Biya
Affan Waheed as Shafay
Bushra Ansari as Memona: Shafay's mother
Behroze Sabzwari as Tabrez: Shafay's Uncle and Memona's Brother
Fahad Rehmani as Nazeer
Kashif Mehmood as Nasir: Biya's brother
Sana Fakhar as Tabinda: Nasir's wife
Arsalan Faisal as Rohail
Aqeel Abbas as Salman: Tabinda's brother
Anam Tanveer as Dr. Ayesha
Yalmaz Syed as Patient

International broadcast
In Arab world, it was premiered on the subscription channel MBC Plus Drama under the title صراح القدر.

Reception
The series received positive reviews from the critics and was commended for the topic. The theme of the series revolves around the myths surrounding HIV/AIDS in our society.

The series received high ratings and was a commercial success. In terms of TRPs, the serial several times beat the blockbuster of Geo Entertainment's Khaani.

Awards and nominations

References

External links
 

Pakistani drama television series
2018 Pakistani television series debuts
2018 Pakistani television series endings
Urdu-language television shows
ARY Digital original programming
ARY Digital